The 2020 Metro Manila Summer Film Festival was planned to be the first edition of the annual Metro Manila Summer Film Festival. It was to be organized by the MMDA in partnership with the Cinema Exhibitors Association of the Philippines. The film festival would have a theme centered on Pinoy Pride.

Entries
The 2020 Metro Manila Summer Film Festival would have eight entries. The entries would be selected among submitted finished films produced not earlier than January 1, 2020 and films earlier submitted for the 2019 Metro Manila Film Festival finished film competition. Entries were submitted by February 15, 2020, for the full-length films. For the Short Film Competition which was opened to students, the deadline for submission was set on February 28, 2020.

On March 2, the Metro Manila Film Festival (MMFF) Executive Committee announced the eight official entries for these year first ever summer edition of the Metro Manila Film Festival. These eight films were chosen among 24 film submissions. The film festival was originally scheduled from April 11 (Black Saturday) to 21 in cinemas nationwide, however, when the cinemas were closed due to the COVID-19 pandemic, all of the films were either not released or delayed into new dates.

COVID-19 pandemic and cancellation
The inaugural Metro Manila Summer Film Festival was later cancelled due to the COVID-19 pandemic It was originally scheduled to run on April 11 – 21, 2020. The Parade of Stars was planned to be hosted in Quezon City prior to the run of the film festival and the awards night was set to be held on April 15.

One of its entries, Love the Way U Lie, was released on Netflix on August 20, 2020. While the other four entries, Coming Home, Isa Pang Bahaghari, The Missing and Tagpuan would be moved into the list of the entries in that film festival to be held in December. Love or Money was released on March 12, 2021, on KTX.ph, iWantTFC and Sky Cable PPV (supposed to be also available on Cignal PPV, but was pre-empted by the extended availability of Hello Stranger: The Movie).

References

2020 MMSFF
2020 MMSFF
MMFF
2020 MMSFF
Metro Manila Summer Film Festival
Metro Manila Summer Film Festival
Metro Manila Summer Film Festival